Sunstorm is the fifth album by folk musician John Stewart, former member of the Kingston Trio, released in 1972.

Track listing
All compositions by John Stewart except where noted.

Side one
 "Kansas Rain" – 2:30
 "Cheyenne" – 3:35
 "Bring It On Home" – 2:06
 "Sunstorm" – 2:35
 "Arkansas Breakout" – 3:35

Side two
 "An Account of Haley's Comet" (John Stewart, John S. Stewart) – 3:55
 "Joe" – 3:05
 "Light Come Shine" – 3:28
 "Lonesome John" – 2:39
 "Drive Again" – 3:19

Recorded at Amigo Studios, North Hollywood, and Independence Recorders, Studio City.

"An Account of Haley's Comet" features the voice of John Stewart's father, the horse trainer John S. Stewart.

Personnel
 John Stewart – vocals, acoustic guitar, handclaps
 Russ Kunkel - drums
 Ron Tutt - drums
 David Kemper - drums
 Jerry Scheff - bass
 Arnie Moore - bass
 Bryan Garofalo - bass, background vocals
 Glen Hardin - piano
 Larry Knechtel - piano
 Loren Newkirk - piano
 Michael Stewart - shakers, acoustic guitar, background vocals, handclaps
 Buffy Ford - guido, background vocals
 James Burton - electric guitar, electric sitar, dobro
 Bill Cunningham - fiddle
 Henry Diltz - harmonica, background vocals
 Buddy Emmons - pedal steel
 Mike Deasy - electric guitar
 Larry Carlton - electric guitar
 King Errisson - congas, percussion
 Bill Mumy - handclaps
 Gary David - handclaps
 James Horn - horns
 Chuck Findley - horns
 Paul Hubinon - horns
 Jack Carone - background vocals
 Laura Creamer - background vocals

Additional personnel
 Michael Stewart - producer
 Ron Malo - engineer
 Glen D. Hardin - working arrangements
 Jimmie Haskell - string arrangements
 Henry Diltz - photography
 David Clarke - art direction

References

1972 albums
John Stewart (musician) albums
Warner Records albums
Albums arranged by Jimmie Haskell
Albums produced by Michael Stewart (musician)